Elena Lagadinova (May 9, 1930 – October 29, 2017) was a Bulgarian agronomist, genetic engineer, and politician.

During the Second World War, Lagadinova contributed to the Bulgarian resistance to German occupation, earning the nickname “Амазонка” or “The Amazon.” She was the youngest female fighter in Bulgaria, beginning her contributions to the war effort at 11 years old and actively fighting at age 14.

Following the Allied victory in 1945, she pursued a PhD in agrobiology, before serving as a research scientist at the Bulgarian Academy of Sciences. There, she developed a new strain of wheat, Triticale, which helped to boost the productivity of collective farms. For this discovery, she was awarded the Order of Cyril and Methods by the Bulgarian Government.

In 1968, Lagadinova accepted the position as Secretary of the Fatherland Front and President of the Committee of the Bulgarian Women's Movement. In these roles, she played a significant role in the creation and enforcement of legislation to benefit women in the workplace, including maternity leave laws. She was also a notable figure in global politics, working with other international activists to forge a coalition of national women's organisations, and becoming a member of the UN Institute for Training Women in 1985.

She died on October 29, 2017, in a retirement facility in Sofia, Bulgaria.

Early life 

Lagadinova was born in the mountain town of Razlog, Bulgaria in 1930. She came from a low-income background and she lost her mother at the age of four. Her father raised her and her two brothers. In her early life, she was surrounded by discussion of the revolution and political commitment, with Lagadinova's father being an early supporter of the Bulgarian Communist Party. Additionally, her oldest brother, who was eighteen years older had fled to the Soviet Union to pursue work in the Communist International.
Lagadinova experienced the Second World War through her family. Her entire family in some form or another were fighting fascism in her native Razlong. She hid the identities of her family members, namely her brothers, and the actions of her father which were her contributions early in the war. Furthermore, she helped supply nearby villages with necessary resources during the war. At fourteen, Lagadinova committed herself to becoming a freedom fighter with her father and brothers, making her one of the youngest partisans to fight in her area at the time.

World War II 
Bulgaria was allied with the Nazis during World War II. In 1941 Bulgaria passed the “Law for the Protection of the Nation,” which eliminated the civil rights of Bulgarian Jews. In 1941, Bulgaria also supported the Germans in the invasion of the Balkans, occupied most of Eastern Yugoslavia and deported up to 20,000 Jews from their occupied territories. Elena Lagadinova's entire family, and much of the resistance fighting against the Nazis at the time, were Communists. In 1944, the Bulgarian monarchy sent the gendarmerie to eliminate the partisan threat and showed up to her family home in Razlog with grenades. She managed to escape to the Pirin Mountains.

After escaping to the mountains, Lagadinova started fighting in the summer of 1944 and became the youngest female partisan fighter in Bulgaria during World War II. She started contributing to the war effort at eleven years old, and by fourteen was fighting along with her brothers in World War II against the Nazi allied Bulgarian monarchy. Lagadinova was also an iatak, helper of the other partisans, that would deliver messages to her other family members during the war. Lagadinova's job was more dangerous, because as an iatak she had to remain within the cities and had a greater chance of getting caught and killed. While Lagadinova survived, her brother Assen was captured and decapitated by the gendarmerie during the war.

Her nickname during the war was “The Amazon” (Амазонка). Throughout the war posters and propaganda slogans were made based on her. She earned her nickname through her courage and tenacity for fighting. From Sofia to Moscow various different children's magazines praised her courage and strength with the slogan for boys and girls to “be brave like the Amazon."

After the Allied victory in 1945, Lagadinova was sent to the Soviet Union to complete her education. She studied at the Timiryazev Academy in Moscow, (formally named the Moscow Agricultural Institute) considered to be the “oldest internationally renowned institute in Russia.” There, she earned a doctoral degree in biology.

Contributions to plant genetics 
Following the end of the war, Lagadinova pursued a PhD in agrobiology at the Timiryazev Academy in Moscow and conducted additional research in England and Sweden. She returned to Sofia to serve as a research scientist and agricultural geneticist at the Bulgarian Academy of Sciences. She served as a research scientist for thirteen years; her research helped develop a new robust hybrid strand of wheat Triticale which helped boost the productivity of collective farms. In 1959, the Bulgarian government awarded Lagadinvoa the Order of Cyril and Methods to recognize her achievements in the field of plant genetics.

Political career 
A Party Cadre assigned to oversee Lagadinova attempted to politically influence the Bulgarian Academy of Science's research program, an action which prompted Lagadinova to write a letter to Soviet Premier Leonid Brezhnev. In her letter, she raised concerns over the Party Cadre's lack of technical expertise interfering with her research efforts and made recommendations for the Soviet Union. Her letter was intercepted by Todor Zhivkov, the General Secretary of the Bulgarian Communist Party. In 1968, Zhivkov coerced Lagadinova to accept a position as the Secretary of the Fatherland Front and president of the Committee of the Bulgarian Women's Movement.

The Bulgarian Politburo wished to promote education to ensure the incorporation of women into the formal labour market. The country passed laws that supported the formal training of women in many previously male dominated fields such as engineering and reduced women's dependence on men, through legalizing abortion services and relaxing divorce laws. By 1965, Bulgaria was projected to have the most women in the workforce in the world. These policies resulted in a decrease in the birth rate, which raised concerns for the future labour supply of the state. The state believed that Lagadinova's background in science would aid the state in devising a solution to the declining population. Many government officials began to consider outlawing abortion, like neighboring Romania in order to boost the birth rate.

In order to generate data, Lagadinova led the Committee of the Bulgarian Women's Movement  (CBWM) to collaborate with the Central Statistical Agency and the editorial board of the Woman Today, the most circulated women's magazine in Bulgaria. In 1969, The CBWM received over 16,000 responses from working women. Their findings indicated that the majority of Bulgarian women wished to have more children, but she felt overworked and unable to balance both work and maternal duties. The survey also revealed that 12% of Bulgarian children under the age of seven were left without supervision during the work day. The CBWM recommended that the state provide women with paid maternity leave and expand the availability of kindergartens and creches.

The CBMW also played a large role in the enforcement of legislation that benefits women in the workplace, such as limiting working hours for mothers, and addressing the lack of quality women's clothing. By 1975, Bulgarian women were promised a 120-day maternity leave, with an additional six months of paid leave at the national minimum wage. Women were guaranteed unpaid leave for three years, and after were promised a space in a kindergarten. Employers were legally obligated to hold a woman's position in a mother's absence.

Contribution to internationalism and women's rights 
Lagadinova contributed to women's right by improving the lives of families in the Eastern and Western Bloc. During her presidency of the Committee of the Bulgarian Women's Movement (CBWM) she worked with the Women's International Democratic Federation (WIDF) which aimed to bring women both at the eastern and western bloc of the Cold War together to stop the aggression. Elena also provided material and logical support for new women committees and movements across Asia and Africa.

At the third World Conference on Women in 1985 in Nairobi, she was elected as a general rapporteur. From that year onwards till 1988, she also became the member of the UN Institute for Training Women. In 1973, thanks to Elena's persistence and advocacy, the Bulgaria government passed a law which allowed maternity leave up to three years for each child, with a guarantee of a secured job and years of maternity counted towards retirement. She also pressured the government to commit to building thousands of new kindergartens.

Lagadinova worked with other international activities during the United Nations 1975's International Year of Women, setting up international coalitions of women's organisations in the 1970s and 1980s to pressure governments to fund maternity leaves. Thanks in part to her work, all countries except Papua New Guinea, Suriname, Liberia and the United States, now legally guarantee some form of paid maternity leave.

Awards 
In 1959, Lagadinova Lagadinova was awarded the Order of Cyril, by the Government of Bulgaria for her work in plant genetics. In 1991, Lagadinova received the prestigious “Presidential Medal of Outstanding Achievement” by the Claremont Graduate School in California.

Death 
In 1989, Lagadinova retired from public life. Twenty-seven years after retirement, Lagadinova had an interview with American ethnographer Kristen Ghodsee, in which she advised, “You must fight for something you believe in.” On October 29, 2017, Lagadinova died in her sleep at Sofia, Bulgaria.

Further reading
Kristen Ghodsee, Red Valkyries: Feminist Lessons from Five Revolutionary Women. New York and London: Verso Books, 2022,

References 

Bulgarian resistance members
1930 births
2017 deaths
20th-century Bulgarian women politicians
20th-century Bulgarian politicians
Bulgarian Communist Party politicians
People from Razlog
Women agronomists
Bulgarian agronomists
Bulgarian women scientists
Bulgarian socialist feminists
Agricultural Academy, Sofia
Bulgarian expatriates in the Soviet Union
Female anti-fascists